Jennifer Brady and Caroline Dolehide were the defending champions but chose not to participate.

Ingrid Neel and Rosalie van der Hoek won the title, defeating Fernanda Contreras and Catherine Harrison in the final, 6–3, 6–3.

Seeds

Draw

Draw

References

External Links
Main Draw

Surbiton Trophy - Doubles